The 1950 Red River flood was a devastating flood that took place along the Red River in The Dakotas and Manitoba from April 15 to June 12, 1950. Damage was particularly severe in the city of Winnipeg and its environs, which were inundated on May 5, also known as Black Friday to some residents.

An estimated 70,000–100,000 residents had to be evacuated, and four of eleven bridges were destroyed. One man died, and property losses due to the flood were estimated at more than $600 million to one billion.

To prevent and reduce future damage, the government constructed the Red River Floodway, which was completed in 1968. It has been estimated to have prevented more than $100 billion (CAD) in cumulative flood damage.

Winnipeg

Although seasonal flooding was common, this flood surpassed the others. The north-flowing Red River was fed by flows resulting from melting of heavy snows in the winter and runoff from heavy rains in the spring. Eight dikes gave way and flooded much of Winnipeg, turning an estimated  of farmland in the area into an enormous lake. The city turned to the Canadian Army and the Red Cross for help.

Four of eleven bridges in the city were destroyed and approximately 100,000 people had to be evacuated from their homes and businesses. This was the largest evacuation in Canadian history until the 1979 Mississauga train derailment. In Winnipeg there was one fatality; property damage was severe, with losses estimated at between $600 million and more than a billion dollars. The flood postponed opening day for baseball in the Mandak League due to inundation of Osborne Stadium. The league and president Jimmy Dunn arranged benefit games to raise money for Winnipeg's Flood Fund.

As a result of the damage, the government built the Red River Floodway, to divert flood waters from Winnipeg to more distant portions of the river. The project was completed in 1968 and has been used 20 times. From 1950 to about 1997, it was derogatorily referred to as "Duff's Ditch", after the premier (Dufferin Roblin) that built the floodway. It is estimated to have prevented more than $100 billion (CAD) in cumulative flood damage.  The Floodway was designated a National Historic Site of Canada in 2000, and is considered an outstanding engineering achievement both in terms of function and effects.

United States
Flooding in the Red River Valley of the United States resulted in five deaths.

See also
Red River of the North
1997 Red River flood
Red River Floodway

References

External links
 SOS! Canadian Disasters, a virtual museum exhibition at Library and Archives Canada.
 Photos and newspapers from the 1950 flood in Manitoba

Red River of the North
History of Winnipeg
Floods in Canada
Red River
Red River
Red River 
Red River 
Natural disasters in Manitoba
Red_River_flood, 1950
Red_River_flood, 1950
Red_River_flood, 1950
Floods in the United States
Red River floods